Nitsa Tsaganea (17 February 1902 – 30 April 2002) was a Greek actress of theatre and film.

Biography
Eleni Laskari was the second wife of actor Christos Tsaganeas. Her most famous movies were Enas iroas me pantoufles and Oi Germanoi xanarhonte. 

Tsaganea died on 30 April 2002 and was buried at the Athens First Cemetery, next to her daughter, actress Liana Vitsori.

Filmography

References

External links

1902 births
2002 deaths
Actresses from Athens
Greek film actresses
National Liberation Front (Greece) members
Greek centenarians
Women centenarians